Choi Yu-jin may refer to:
 Choi Yu-jin (figure skater)
 Choi Yu-jin (singer)